The 2005 Asian Airgun Championships were held in Bangkok, Thailand between 12 and 19 September 2005.

Medal summary

Men

Women

Medal table

References 
General
 ISSF Results Overview

Specific

External links 
 Asian Shooting Confederation

Asian Shooting Championships
Asian
Shooting
2005 in Thai sport
Shooting competitions in Thailand